Wish You Were Here, Buddy is a studio album by Pat Boone, released in 1966 on Dot Records.

Billboard picked the album for its "Spotlight" section.

Track listing

References 

1966 albums
Pat Boone albums
Dot Records albums
Albums produced by Randy Wood (record producer)